The Kallikak Family: A Study in the Heredity of Feeble-Mindedness was a 1912 book by the American psychologist and eugenicist Henry H. Goddard, dedicated to his patron Samuel Simeon Fels. Supposedly an extended case study of Goddard’s for the inheritance of "feeble-mindedness", a general category referring to a variety of mental disabilities including intellectual disability, learning disabilities, and mental illness, the book is noted for factual inaccuracies that render its conclusions invalid. Goddard believed that a variety of mental traits were hereditary and that society should limit reproduction by people possessing these traits.

The name Kallikak is a pseudonym used as a family name throughout the book. Goddard coined the name from the Greek words καλός (kallos) meaning good and κακός (kakos) meaning bad.

Summary 

The book begins by discussing the case of "Deborah Kallikak" (real name Emma Wolverton, 1889–1978), a woman in Goddard's institution, the New Jersey Home for the Education and Care of Feebleminded Children (now Vineland Training School). In the course of investigating her genealogy, Goddard claims to have discovered that her family tree bore a curious and surprising moral tale.

The book follows the genealogy of Martin Kallikak, Deborah's great-great-great grandfather, a Revolutionary War hero married to a Quaker woman. On his way back from battle the normally morally upright Martin dallied one time with a "feeble-minded" barmaid. He impregnated her and then abandoned her. The young Martin soon reformed and went on with his upright life, becoming a respected New England citizen and father of a large family of prosperous individuals. All of the children that came from this relationship were "wholesome" and had no signs of developmental disabilities.

But according to Goddard, a child was born by the dalliance with "the nameless feeble-minded girl". This single child, a male, called Martin Kallikak Jr. in the book (real name John Wolverton, 1776–1861), went on to father more children, who fathered their own children, and on and on down the generations. And so with the Kallikaks, Goddard claims to have discovered, one has as close as one could imagine an experiment in the hereditability of intelligence, moral ability, and criminality.

On the "feeble-minded" side of the Kallikak family, descended from the abandoned single-parent barmaid, the children wound up poor, mentally ill, delinquent, and intellectually disabled.  Deborah was, in Goddard's assessment, "feeble-minded": a catch-all early 20th century term to describe various forms of intellectual or learning disabilities. Goddard was interested in the heritability of "feeble-mindedness"—and often wrote of the invisible threat of recessive "feeble-minded" genes carried by otherwise healthy and intelligent looking members of the population (Mendel's laws had only been rediscovered a decade before; Goddard's genetic shorthand was, in its day, considered to be on par with cutting-edge science). It was in tracing the family history of Deborah that Goddard and his assistants discovered that Deborah's family of drunks and criminals was related—through Martin Kallikak—to another family tree of economy and prosperity.

On the "normal" side of the Kallikak family tree, the children Martin had with his wife and their descendants all ended up prosperous, intelligent, and morally upstanding. They were lawyers, ministers, and doctors. None were "feeble-minded". Goddard concluded from this that intelligence, sanity, and morality were hereditary, and every effort should be undertaken to keep the 'feeble-minded' from procreating, with the overall goal of potentially ending 'feeble-mindedness' and its accompanying traits. The damage from even one dalliance between a young man and a "feeble-minded" woman could create generations and generations worth of crime and poverty, with its members eventually living off the generosity of the state (and consequently taxpayers), Goddard argued. His work contains intricately constructed family trees, showing near-perfect Mendelian ratios in the inheritance of negative and positive traits.

Goddard recommended segregating them in institutions, where they would be taught how to work various forms of menial labor.

Present-day evaluation 

In its day, The Kallikak Family was a tremendous success and went through multiple printings. It helped propel Goddard to the status of one of the nation's top experts in using psychology in policy, and along with the work of Charles B. Davenport and Madison Grant is considered one of the canonical works of early 20th-century American eugenics.

Research published in 2001 by David MacDonald and Nancy McAdams revealed that Goddard's account of the division of the Kallikak family into a "good" lineage—descended from Martin Kallikak Sr. and his wife—and a "bad" lineage—descended from Martin Kallikak Sr. and an unnamed feeble-minded barmaid—was fictitious. Martin Kallikak Jr., the supposedly illegitimate offspring of Martin Kallikak Sr. and the barmaid, was in fact the son of Gabriel Wolverton and his wife Catherine Murray. His real name was John Wolverton (1776–1861), and he was a landowner prosperous enough to buy two tracts of land for cash in 1809. Census records of 1850 show that all the adults in his household (which included Wolverton, one daughter, and several grandchildren) were able to read. The "bad" side of the Kallikak family included poor farmers but also school teachers, an Army Air Corps pilot, and a bank treasurer.

It has been argued that the effects of malnutrition were overlooked in the Kallikak family.  Goddard's peer, Davenport, even identified various forms of diseases now known to be caused by diet deficiencies as being hereditary.

Another perspective has been offered that the Kallikaks almost certainly had undiagnosed fetal alcohol syndrome. In addition to poverty and malnourishment, prenatal alcohol exposure can create craniofacial and other physical anomalies that could account for their peculiar facial features. Furthermore, prenatal alcohol exposure may also damage the central nervous system, which can result in impaired cognitive and behavioral functioning similar to that described by Goddard.

Alteration of photographs 
The paleontologist and science writer Stephen Jay Gould advanced the view that Goddard—or someone working with him—had retouched the photographs used in his book in order to make the "bad" Kallikaks appear more menacing. In older editions of the books, Gould said, it has become clearly evident that someone had drawn in darker, "crazier" looking eyes and menacing faces on the children and adults in the pictures. Gould argues that photographic reproduction in books was still then a very new art, and that audiences would not have been as keenly aware of photographic retouching, even on such a crude level. The 14 photos were subsequently studied further to show the nature of the retouching and subsequent use to help make Goddard's points.

The psychologist R. E. Fancher, however, has claimed that retouching of faces of the sort which is apparent in Goddard's work was a common procedure at the time, in order to avoid a "washed out" look that was common to early photographic printing methods (poor halftones). Furthermore, Fancher argued, malicious editing on Goddard's part would take away from one of his primary claims: that only a trained eye can spot the moron in the crowd.

Influence 

The overall effect of The Kallikak Family was to temporarily increase funding to institutions such as Goddard's, but these were not seen to be worthwhile solutions of the problem of "feeble-mindedness" (much less "rogue" "feeble-mindedness"—the threat of idiocy as a recessive trait), and more stringent methods, such as compulsory sterilization of people with intellectual disabilities, were undertaken.

The term "Kallikak" became, along with "Jukes" and "Nams" (other case studies of similar natures), a cultural shorthand for the rural poor in the Southern and Northeastern United States.

In August 1977, NBC premiered a situation comedy called The Kallikaks, which depicted the comic misadventures of an Appalachian family that moved to California and feuded with another family named the Jukes; the series lasted only five episodes. A June 8, 1987, cartoon in The New Yorker provided a further update to the concept, depicting "The Jukes and Kallikaks Today".

In the book The Manchurian Candidate, Richard Condon makes an adjective of the Kallikak name in describing a country music song in the 1950s: "... a loudly lovable old standard out of Memphis, Tennessee, in which the rhyme of the proper name Betty Lou and the plural noun shoes were repeated, in a Kallikakian couplet, over and over again...."

See also

References

Further reading 
Henry H. Goddard, The Kallikak Family: A Study in the Heredity of Feeble-Mindedness, New York: Macmillan, 1912.
Stephen Jay Gould, The Mismeasure of Man, Norton: New York, 1996, revised edn.
R. E. Fancher, "Henry Goddard and the Kallikak family photographs," American Psychologist, 42 (1987), 585-590.
 J. David Smith, Minds Made Feeble : The Myth and Legacy of the Kallikaks, Rockville, MD : Aspen, 1985 

 J. David Smith, Michael L. Wehmeyer, "Good Blood, Bad Blood: Science, Nature, and the Myth of the Kallikaks," Washington, DC : AAIDD, 2012 
 Shirley Garton Straney, "The Kallikak Family: A Genealogical Examination of a Classic in Psychology," The American Genealogist, 69 (April 1994): 65-80.

External links 

 Digitised version of the 1912 edition of The Kallikak Family.
 
 Latest Book on the Kallikak Family / Good Blood, Bad Blood: Science, Nature, and the Myth of the Kallikaks
 1919 Report by the Kansas Commission on Provision for the Feeble Minded The Kallikaks of Kansas

Eugenics
Eugenics in the United States
Euthenics
History of eugenics
1912 non-fiction books
Criminology
Working-class culture in New Jersey